Lise Arsenault (born 14 December 1954) was a gymnast, who competed in team gymnastics at the 1972 Summer Olympics and the 1976 Summer Olympics in Montreal. Canada made its best ever placing that year. She failed to qualify for individual competition, though.

She lived in Brampton at the time of competition.

References

1954 births
Living people
Gymnasts at the 1972 Summer Olympics
Gymnasts at the 1976 Summer Olympics
Canadian female artistic gymnasts
Olympic gymnasts of Canada
Pan American Games medalists in gymnastics
Pan American Games bronze medalists for Canada
Gymnasts at the 1971 Pan American Games